The Canadian Railroad Historical Association (CRHA) ( (ACHF)) is a non-profit organization established in 1932 in Canada and is "devoted to preserving and interpreting Canada's railway heritage, which its founders and members have safeguarded from coast to coast."  It is headquartered in Saint-Constant, Quebec and organized into 8 divisions located across the country.

The CRHA has owned and operated the Canadian Railway Museum, currently branded as ExpoRail, since 1961.  It also has published the magazine Canadian Rail since 1937.

Local divisions
 Calgary & Southwestern Division (covering Alberta and the prairies)
 Charny Division (covering Quebec)
 Esquimalt & Nanaïmo Division (covering Vancouver Island, British Columbia)
 Kingston Division (covering eastern Ontario)
 New Brunswick Division (covering New Brunswick and the Atlantic provinces)
 Niagara Division (covering southwestern Ontario) see www.crhaniagara.com
 Pacific Coast Division (covering mainland British Columbia)
 Toronto & York Division (covering central Ontario)

References

External links
 Canadian Railroad Historical Association - official website

Rail transport preservation in Canada
History of rail transport in Canada
Historical societies of Canada
Non-profit organizations based in Quebec
1932 establishments in Quebec